Mi Macro Calzada is the first line of the Guadalajara Macrobús. It runs along  on the Independencia roadway and the Gobernador Curiel Avenue from the southern terminus, Fray Angélico, north to Mirador, with a total of 27 stations. The line has connections with line 2 and line 3 of the light rail at the San Juan de Dios and Bicentenario stations, respectively, and with the second BRT line, Mi Macro Periférico, at the Independencia Norte station. In the near future, it will also have a connection with line 4 at the Fray Angélico station.

Its main stations, not including the terminals, are:
 San Juan de Dios, which has a connection with the line 2 of the light rail and with the Guadalajara trolleybus (line 3 of Sitren).
 Bicentenario, which has a connection with the Independencia station of the line 3 of the light rail.
 Independencia Norte, which has a connection with the second BRT line, Mi Macro Periférico.

History 
Construction of this line began in April 2008 and was completed in a record time of one year on March 10, 2009. With this, Guadalajara got its first BRT route, and it was the first in Mexico to implement passing lanes, as well as an Express service.

Starting February 25, 2012, televisors were installed on most units of the system. Between 2021 and 2022, the fleet of the line was entirely renewed.

Fleet 

The Mi Macro Calzada fleet is composed of high-floor articulated buses of the Volvo brand, very similar to those used by the Metrobús BRT system from Mexico City. Initially, the first line operated with 41 buses of the Volvo 7300BRT model. On September 17, 2014, four new units were acquired, this time the DINA Brighter model; these new units were red, taller, more silent, equipped with CCTV, and had a higher user capacity.

The Mi Macro Calzada fleet thus currently comprises 45 articulated buses.

Between 2021 and 2022 the units of the system were updated with a new "coat of paint" to blend with the new image of the Macrobús system, now simply known as "Mi Macro".

Impact and number of passengers 

In February 2008, there were 130 bus routes that moved through Independencia roadway and Gobernador Curiel Avenue, serviced by more than 2000 buses. Mi Macro Calzada replaced all the conventional buses along the route. Many routes were erased, while others were modified to cross by the BRT route and serve as feeder buses.

Due to the route of Mi Macro Calzada, numerous public transport routes were rerouted. Among these were routes 142, 142 A, 258 D, 110, 110 A, 207, and 13; they were rerouted away from Independencia roadway and Gobernador Curiel Avenue. Additionally, the 62 D route was eliminated. Currently, the only route that provides service on most of the route of the BRT is the 62 route from Transporte Vanguardista de Occidente, which causes traffic even though it helps to decongest the BRT.

Mi Macro Calzada moves 102 000 daily passengers.

Routes

Line 1: Parador Service 

The stations with the  logo have Express service.

Line 1: Express Service 

The Express service of Mi Macro Calzada was made with the objective of providing a faster service to its users. It operates providing service only in 12 of the 27 stations. Since September 17, 2014, the service was extended until the Mirador station, spanning 5 more stations, which are: Clemente Orozco, Circunvalación, San Patricio, Independencia Norte and Mirador; the objective being to offload the Parador Service during peak hours, as well as reducing the travel time almost in half.

It is worth noting that the Express service provides a special service in the Monumental station, located on Independencia Norte roadway, between Fidel Velázquez and Monte Carmelo streets, the days when there's a game in the Jalisco stadium after 18:00.

Before September 17, 2014, there were only 7 express stations.

Originally there were only 9 express stations. The Alameda, La Paz and Héroes de Nacozari stations were included in this generation.

Like in this example:

The Niños Héroes station did not provide this service; nevertheless, the route was modified to include it, reducing the stops and travel time for the users of this station.

Feeder routes

Operation 
According to INEGI data, Mi Macro Calzada operates with 40 units on working days and with 26 on weekends.

See also

References 

Mi Macro
2009 establishments in Mexico